The Randolph County Courthouse is a historic courthouse located at Asheboro, Randolph County, North Carolina. It was designed by Wheeler, Runge & Dickey and built in 1908–1909. It is a three-story, Classical Revival style yellow brick building with a hipped roof. It features a powerful Second Empire dome clad in ribbed tile and front portico. The two other contributing buildings are an early-20th century jail and late Victorian brick building containing law offices.

It was listed on the National Register of Historic Places in 1979.

References

Courthouses on the National Register of Historic Places in North Carolina
Neoclassical architecture in North Carolina
Second Empire architecture in North Carolina
Victorian architecture in North Carolina
Government buildings completed in 1909
Buildings and structures in Randolph County, North Carolina
Asheboro, North Carolina
County courthouses in North Carolina
National Register of Historic Places in Randolph County, North Carolina